Events from the 1410s in England.

Incumbents
Monarch – Henry IV (to 20 March 1413), then Henry V

Events
 1410
 Owain Glyndŵr continues his rebellion against England, although a costly English raid into rebel-held Shropshire is believed to have led to the capture of a number of rebel leaders.
 1411
 30 November – Henry IV dismisses Henry, Prince of Wales and his allies from the royal council.
 1412
 May – England allies with the Armagnac party in return for help in regaining control of Aquitaine.
 Owain Glyndŵr cuts through the King's men and captures, later ransoming, a leading Welsh supporter of King Henry's, Dafydd Gam, in an ambush in Brecon. However, this is the last time that Owain is seen by his enemies.
 1413
 21 March – Henry V becomes King following the death of his father Henry IV in the "Jerusalem" chamber of Westminster Abbey.
 9 April – coronation of King Henry V at Westminster Abbey in a snowstorm.
 December – body of Richard II of England re-interred at Westminster Abbey as a gesture of reconciliation.
 1414
 9 January – a Lollard rebellion in London is suppressed.
 27 April – Henry Chichele enthroned as Archbishop of Canterbury.
 August – Henry V claims the throne of France.
Durham School is founded as a grammar school by Thomas Langley, Prince-Bishop of Durham.
 1415
 5 August – Southampton Plot to depose Henry V in favour of Edmund Mortimer, 5th Earl of March fails and the ringleaders are executed.
 13 August – Hundred Years' War: Henry V begins an invasion of Normandy.
 22 September – Hundred Years' War: English capture Harfleur.
 25 October – Hundred Years' War: Henry V is victorious over the French at the Battle of Agincourt.
 Henry V offers a pardon to the fugitive Welsh rebel leader Owain Glyndŵr, but it is refused.
 Twickenham Monastery founded; the last new English monastery of the Middle Ages.
 1416
 1 May – Hundred Years' War: French fleet blockades Harfleur.
 15 August – Hundred Years' War: Harfleur relieved, following a naval battle in the estuary of the Seine.
 1417
 23 July – Hundred Years' War: Henry V leads an army of 12,000 men on a new invasion of Normandy.
 12 August – Henry V begins writing his official correspondence in English, marking the beginning of its restoration as the official language of Government in England.
 8 September – Hundred Years' War: English capture Caen.
 14 December – Lollard leader John Oldcastle captured and executed.
 John Capgrave writes Chronicle, a history of England since the creation.
 1418
 18 February – Hundred Years' War: English capture Falaise.
 30 July – Hundred Years' War: English Siege of Rouen begins.
 22 August – Hundred Years' War: English capture Cherbourg.
 1419
 19 January – Hundred Years' War: Rouen falls to the English, who take control of Normandy.
 30 July – Hundred Years' War: English capture Pontoise.
 13 October – Richard Whittington is elected Lord Mayor of London for the last time.
 25 December – Hundred Years' War: Philip the Good, Duke of Burgundy, allies with England against France.

Births
 1411
 21 September – Richard Plantagenet, 3rd Duke of York, claimant to the throne (died 1460)
 1415
 3 May – Cecily Neville, mother of Edward IV of England and Richard III of England (died 1495)
 12 September – John de Mowbray, 3rd Duke of Norfolk, Duke (died 1461)
 William Worcester, topographer, antiquary and chronicler (died c. 1482)
 1416
 26 October – Edmund Grey, 1st Earl of Kent (died 1490)
 1417
 23 November – William FitzAlan, 9th Earl of Arundel, politician (died 1487)

Deaths
 1410
 16 March – John Beaufort, 1st Earl of Somerset (born c. 1373)
 13 September – Isabella of Valois, queen consort of England (born 1389, France)
 John Badby, martyr (year of birth unknown)
 John Gower, poet (born c. 1330)
 1411
 September – Anne de Mortimer, Countess of Cambridge (born 1390)
 1412
 Walter Froucester, Abbot of Gloucester
 1413
 25 January – Maud de Ufford, Countess of Oxford (born 1345)
 20 March – King Henry IV (born 1367)
 1414
 19 February – Thomas Arundel, Archbishop of Canterbury (born 1353)
 1 September – William de Ros, 6th Baron de Ros, Lord Treasurer (born 1369)
 1415
 19 July – Philippa of Lancaster, queen of John I of Portugal (plague) (born 1359)
 5 August – Southampton Plot ringleaders (executed)
 Richard of Conisburgh, 3rd Earl of Cambridge (born c. 1375)
 Thomas Grey (born 1384)
 Henry Scrope, 3rd Baron Scrope of Masham (born c. 1376)
 August or September – Michael de la Pole, 2nd Earl of Suffolk (killed in battle) (born 1367)
 13 October – Thomas FitzAlan, 12th Earl of Arundel, English military leader (born 1381)
 25 October (Battle of Agincourt)
 Michael de la Pole, 3rd Earl of Suffolk (born 1394)
 Edward of Norwich, 2nd Duke of York (born 1373)
 1417
 4 September – Robert Hallam, Bishop of Salisbury (year of birth unknown)
 14 December – John Oldcastle, Lollard leader (year of birth unknown)
 1418
 25 November – Henry Beaufort, 2nd Earl of Somerset (born 1401)
 1419
 3 September – Edmund Stafford, Bishop of Exeter and Lord Chancellor of England (born 1344)
 17 December – William Gascoigne, Chief Justice (born c. 1350)

References